Aritra Dutta Banik is a Bengali film actor who has made several on-screen appearances since 2003. He made his debut in the Bengali megaserial Tithir Atithi, which was aired on ETV Bangla from 2003 to 2009. He drew public attention for the first time during Mithun Chakraborty's dance reality show, Dance Bangla Dance Junior (2007), in which, he anchored the show along with Tathoi Deb. Since then, he has appeared in numerous Bengali films.

Career
Aritra made his first appearance with the Bengali megaserial Tithir Atithi which was aired on ETV Bangla from 2003 to 2009. He gained publicity for the first time as he anchored the show Dance Bangla Dance Junior in Zee Bangla in 2007. After that, he got a chance to act in the 2008 Bengali movie Chirodini Tumi Je Amar along with actors Rahul Banerjee and Priyanka Sarkar. It was his first silver screen appearance. Since then, he has been cast in a number of Bengali films. He has also featured in a lot of television serials and reality shows.

Filmography
Aritra has appeared in the following Bengali films since 2008.

Television

Playback singing
Aritra was also the playback singer for the title song of the 2011 film Hello Memsaheb. The music was composed by Surojit Chatterjee.

References

External links
 

Living people
Male actors in Bengali cinema
Indian male film actors
21st-century Indian male actors
Bengali male actors
Male actors from West Bengal
Year of birth missing (living people)
B. T. Road Government Sponsored H. S. School alumni